NPR1 is an abbreviation for:

 NPR1 - the Natriuretic peptide receptor A/guanylate cyclase A (atrionatriuretic peptide receptor A)
 NPR1 (Arabidopsis thaliana) or AtNPR1 - a gene, the Nonexpresser of Pathogenesis-Related 1 variant found in A. thaliana, used in transgenics